Heliotropium  is a genus of flowering plants in the heliotrope family, Heliotropiaceae.  There are around 325 species in this almost cosmopolitan genus, which are commonly known as heliotropes (sg. ). It is highly toxic for dogs and cats.

Etymology
The name "heliotrope"  derives from the old idea that the inflorescences of these plants turned their rows of flowers to the Sun. Ἥλιος (helios) is Greek for "Sun", τρέπειν (trepein) means "to turn". The Middle English name "turnsole" has the same meaning.

A Classical myth, told in Ovid's Metamorphoses, imagines that the water nymph Clytie, in love with the sun god Helios, was betrayed by him. Wasting away, she transformed into the heliotrope, whose flowers supposedly always face the Sun.

Morphology 
Like other members of the Heliotropiaceae, plants in the genus Heliotropium have 5-merous, tetracyclic flowers and actinomorphic corollas. They likewise share in their characteristic terminal styles and highly modified stigmatic heads (basal stigma, infertile apex). Species in the genus are typically herbs or subshrubs exclusively and are characterized by their dry fruits that divide into two or four mericarpids.

Ecology and human use

Several heliotropes are popular garden plants, most notably garden heliotrope (H. arborescens).  Some species are weeds, and many are hepatotoxic if eaten in large quantities due to abundant pyrrolizidine alkaloids. There have been cases of canine death due to over-ingestion of this toxic plant. Some danaine butterflies, such as male queen butterflies, visit these plants, being attracted to their pyrrolizidine alkaloids. Though it is not palatable and most animals will completely ignore it, there have been cases of horses, swine and cattle being poisoned due to contamination of hay.

Caterpillars of the grass jewel (Freyeria trochylus), a gossamer-winged butterfly, feed on H. strigosum.

The sap of heliotrope flowers, namely of European heliotrope (H. europaeum), was used as a food coloring in Middle Ages and Early Modern French cuisine.

One of the most famous ragtime piano melodies is "Heliotrope Bouquet", composed in 1907 by Louis Chauvin (the first two strains) and Scott Joplin (the last two strains).

Garden heliotrope is grown in Southern Europe as an ingredient for perfume.

The purplish facial rash of dermatomyositis is called "heliotrope rash" because it resembles E. arborescens.

Heliotrine and heliotridine

Seeds of the Heliotropium genus were discovered in the 1940s and 50s to be responsible for liver disease in populations that consumed them in large quantities, either inadvertently (as a contaminant of food crops) or deliberately (associated with the ingestion of herbal infusions for the treatment of certain ailments). The seeds contained high concentrations of pyrrolizidine alkaloids, identified mainly as the N-oxide of heliotrine (74%), and one or two other compounds similar in character to lasiocarpine.

Taxonomy
Taxonomic revision supported through molecular phylogenetics led to the recognition of Euploca as genus separate from Heliotropium. In contrast, the genus Tournefortia was included in Heliotropium in a 2016 revision.

Within Heliotropium, there are four major clades:
Heliotropium sect. Heliothamnus 
Old World Heliotropium clade
Heliotropium sect. Cochranea 
Tournefortia clade, comprising Tournefortia sect. Tournefortia and all remaining New World Heliotropium species

Origins of diversification 
Three of the four major clades within Heliotropium have their centers of diversity in South America. The origins of the remaining Old World Heliotropium clade can be traced back to a single colonization event from the New World. ITS1 data shows there is a single characteristic long deletion between positions 61 and 111 in the genome of the Old World species, which defines the Old World Heliotropium species and separates them from their New World counterparts. Researchers concluded this is a single autapomorphic character from a single deletion event in the past. This most reasonably explains how the whole group may have come to share this characteristic deletion when comparing the genomes of Old World and New World Heliotropium.

The most likely driver of Heliotropium diversification across the three New World clades is early Andean uplift. Researchers identified three independent diversification events in the phylogeny of Andean Heliotropium, whose timings correspond to late Miocene Andean uplift as well as the development of arid environments in South America during the Pliocene. These three diversification events each mark the separation of the Heliothamnus, Cochranea, and Tournefortia clades from the rest of Heliotropium.

Heliothamnus diversification is estimated to have taken place in the late Miocene. The age of Heliothamnus suggest that its diversification could have been triggered directly by the uplift of the Andes, something that would have promoted speciation in inner-Andean valleys and the Andean scrub. The majority of endemic Heliothamnus taxa in the region are restricted to these sorts of environments, further supporting this theory as the current leading theory explaining Heliothamnus diversification.

Before the main rise of the Andes, Cochranea and Tournefortia coinhabited the Andean region at the same time and significant speciation had not yet occurred. Once the Andes began to rise, Cochranea became isolated on the western side of the Andes while Tournefortia grew on the eastern side. This east-west division is still true of each group’s present distributions. The rise of the Andes affected the climate of the region and is believed to have contributed to the hyperaridity of the Atacama Desert, something that could have acted as an additional barrier to filter out other Heliotropium species into the range of Cochranea, thus promoting Cochranea speciation. Elevation differences would have also acted as barriers that helped promote speciation in Tournefortia species as many large groups within Tournefortia became well-adapted to high-elevation environments while other Heliotropium clades did not and thus could not coinhabit the same environments as Tournefortia.

Selected species

 Heliotropium amplexicaule Vahl – clasping heliotrope, summer heliotrope, blue heliotrope
 Heliotropium anderssonii
 Heliotropium angiospermum
 Heliotropium anomalum Hook. & Arn. – Polynesian heliotrope, Pacific heliotrope (Pacific Islands)
 Heliotropium anomalum var. argenteum – hinahina kū kahakai (Hawaii)
 Heliotropium arborescens – garden heliotrope, common heliotrope, cherry pie
 Heliotropium argenteum
 Heliotropium asperrimum R.Br.
 Heliotropium balfourii
 Heliotropium bracteatum R.Br.
 Heliotropium conocarpum F.Muell. ex Benth.
 Heliotropium crispatum F.Muell. ex Benth.
 Heliotropium diversifolium F.Muell. ex Benth.
 Heliotropium chenopodiaceum (A.DC.) Clos.
 Heliotropium claussenii DC.
 Heliotropium curassavicum L. – seaside heliotrope, salt heliotrope, monkey tail, quail plant, Chinese parsley; cola de mico (Spanish)
 Heliotropium dentatum
 Heliotropium derafontense
 Heliotropium ellipticum
 Heliotropium epacrideum F.Muell. ex Benth.
 Heliotropium europaeum L. – European heliotrope, European turnsole (Europe, Asia, and North Africa)
 Heliotropium fasciculatum R.Br.
 Heliotropium flintii F.Muell. ex A.S.Mitch.
 Heliotropium foertherianum Diane & Hilger – tree heliotrope, velvet soldierbush, octopus bush (South Asia, East Asia, Melanesia, western Polynesia, northern Australia)
 Heliotropium foliatum R.Br.
 Heliotropium glabellum R.Br.
 Heliotropium heteranthum (F.Muell.) Ewart & O.B.Davies
 Heliotropium indicum L. – Indian turnsole
 Heliotropium kuriense
 Heliotropium laceolatum Loefg.
 Heliotropium lineariifolium Phil.
 Heliotropium megalanthumn I.M.Johnst.
 Heliotropium nigricans
 Heliotropium paniculatum R.Br.
 Heliotropium pannifolium – St. Helena heliotrope (Saint Helena) (extinct, c. 1820)
 Heliotropium pauciflorum R.Br.
 Heliotropium paulayanum
 Heliotropium pleiopterum F.Muell.
 Heliotropium popovii 
 Heliotropium prostratum R.Br.
 Heliotropium ramosissimum
 Heliotropium riebeckii
 Heliotropium shoabense
 Heliotropium sinuatum (Miers) I.M.Johnst.
 Heliotropium socotranum
 Heliotropium stenophyllum
 Heliotropium strigosum Willd.
 Heliotropium tenellum
 Heliotropium ventricosum R.Br.
 Heliotropium wagneri
 Heliotropium aff. wagneri (Samhah, Yemen)

Formerly included here
 Chrozophora tinctoria (as H. tricoccum)
 Tournefortia gnaphalodes (L.) R.Br. ex Roem. & Schult. (as H. gnaphalodes L.)

See also
 Turnsole
 Heliotrope (disambiguation)

References

External links 

 A Heliotrope at Gardener's Path 
 Picture of Heliotropium chenopodiaceum at Chileflora